{{taxobox
| image = Řehulková et al - Dactylogyrus - parasite200098-fig03.png
| image_alt = 'Dactylogyrus remi| image_caption = Dactylogyrus sp.
| name = Dactylogyridae
| regnum = Animalia
| phylum = Platyhelminthes
| classis = Monogenea
| ordo = Monopisthocotylea
| familia = Dactylogyridae
| familia_authority = Bychowsky, 1933}}

Dactylogyridae is a family of monogenean flatworms.

GeneraAcolpenteron Fischthal & Allison, 1940Bivaginogyrus Gusev & Gerasev, 1986Dactylogyroides Gusev, 1963Dactylogyrus Diesing, 1850Dicrodactylogyrus Lu & Lang, 1981Dogielius Bychowsky, 1936Leptonchides Chen, 1987Markewitschiana Allamuratov & Koval, 1966Pellucidhaptor Price & Mizelle, 1964Pseudacolpenteron Bychowsky & Gusev, 1955Thaparogyrus'' Gusev, 1976

References

 
Platyhelminthes families